Birger Åsander (13 July 1909 – 17 January 1984) was a Swedish actor. He appeared in more than 90 films and television shows between 1938 and 1980.

Selected filmography

 Career (1938)
 Imprisoned Women (1943)
 The Brothers' Woman (1943)
 The Forest Is Our Heritage (1944)
 My People Are Not Yours (1944)
 The Emperor of Portugallia (1944)
 The Girl and the Devil (1944)
 The Österman Brothers' Virago (1945)
 Barnen från Frostmofjället (1945)
 The Rose of Tistelön (1945)
 Pengar – en tragikomisk saga (1946)
 Incorrigible (1946)
 The Wedding on Solö (1946)
 Rail Workers (1947)
 The Poetry of Ådalen (1947)
 The Bride Came Through the Ceiling (1947)
 Private Bom (1948)
 Big Lasse of Delsbo (1949)
 Dangerous Spring (1949)
 Son of the Sea (1949)
 The Quartet That Split Up (1950)
 The Kiss on the Cruise (1950)
 The Saucepan Journey (1950)
 A Ghost on Holiday (1951)
 Bom the Flyer (1952)
 The Clang of the Pick (1952)
 One Fiancée at a Time (1952)
 The Chieftain of Göinge (1953)
 Bill Bergson and the White Rose Rescue (1953)
Taxi 13 (1954)
 Salka Valka (1954)
 Storm Over Tjurö (1954)
 Our Father and the Gypsy (1954)
 Enchanted Walk (1954)
 The People of Hemsö (1955)
 Uncle's (1955)
 Whoops! (1955)
 The Biscuit (1956)
 The Stranger from the Sky (1956)
 The Song of the Scarlet Flower (1956)
 We at Väddö (1958)
 Rider in Blue (1959)
 Ticket to Paradise (1962)
 Sailors (1964)
 Pistol (1973)

References

External links

1909 births
1984 deaths
20th-century Swedish male actors
Swedish male film actors
Swedish male television actors
People from Västernorrland County